The New York Giants are a professional American football team based in  East Rutherford, New Jersey.

New York Giants may also refer to:

Baseball 
Major League Baseball
 San Francisco Giants, the current Major League Baseball team which originally played in New York City
 New York Giants (baseball), the team from 1883 to 1957 before moving to San Francisco

Other baseball
 New York Giants (PL), a Players League team that played in New York City in 1890
 New York Lincoln Giants, an Eastern Colored League and American Negro league team that played in New York City from about 1911 to about 1930

Other professional sport teams 
American football
 New York Brickley Giants, National Football League franchise, 1921

Association football
 New York Giants (soccer) including
 New York Giants (1894 soccer)
 New York Soccer Club, also called the New York Giants from 1923 and 1930
 New York Nationals (ASL), called the New York Giants between 1930 and 1932